Pitcairnia samuelssonii is a plant species in the genus Pitcairnia.

Cultivars
 Pitcairnia 'Hondo Valle'

References
BSI Cultivar Registry Retrieved 11 October 2009

samuelssonii